A speech error, commonly referred to as a slip of the tongue  (Latin: , or occasionally self-demonstratingly) or misspeaking, is a deviation (conscious or unconscious) from the apparently intended form of an utterance. They can be subdivided into spontaneously and inadvertently produced speech errors and intentionally produced word-plays or puns. Another distinction can be drawn between production and comprehension errors. Errors in speech production and perception are also called performance errors. Some examples of speech error include sound exchange or sound anticipation errors. In sound exchange errors the order of two individual morphemes is reversed, while in sound anticipation errors a sound from a later syllable replaces one from an earlier syllable. Slips of the tongue are a normal and common occurrence. One study shows that most people can make up to as much as 22 slips of the tongue per day.

Speech errors are common among children, who have yet to refine their speech, and can frequently continue into adulthood. When errors continue past the age of 9 they are referred to as "residual speech errors" or RSEs. They sometimes lead to embarrassment and betrayal of the speaker's regional or ethnic origins. However, it is also common for them to enter the popular culture as a kind of linguistic "flavoring". Speech errors may be used intentionally for humorous effect, as with spoonerisms.

Within the field of psycholinguistics, speech errors fall under the category of language production. Types of speech errors include: exchange errors, perseveration, anticipation, shift, substitution, blends, additions, and deletions. The study of speech errors has contributed to the establishment/refinement of models of speech production since Victoria Fromkin's pioneering work on this topic.

Psycholinguistic explanations

Speech errors are made on an occasional basis by all speakers. They occur more often when speakers are nervous, tired, anxious or intoxicated. During live broadcasts on TV or on the radio, for example, nonprofessional speakers and even hosts often make speech errors because they are under stress. Some speakers seem to be more prone to speech errors than others. For example, there is a certain connection between stuttering and speech errors. Charles F. Hockett explains that "whenever a speaker feels some anxiety about possible lapse, he will be led to focus attention more than normally on what he has just said and on what he is just about to say. These are ideal breeding grounds for stuttering." Another example of a "chronic sufferer" is Reverend William Archibald Spooner, whose peculiar speech may be caused by a cerebral dysfunction, but there is much evidence that he invented his famous speech errors (spoonerisms).

An explanation for the occurrence of speech errors comes from psychoanalysis, in the so-called Freudian slip. Sigmund Freud assumed that speech errors are the result of an intrapsychic conflict of concurrent intentions. "Virtually all speech errors [are] caused by the intrusion of repressed ideas from the unconscious into one's conscious speech output", Freud explained. In fact, his hypothesis explains only a minority of speech errors.

Psycholinguistic classification

There are few speech errors that clearly fall into only one category. The majority of speech errors can be interpreted in different ways and thus fall into more than one category. For this reason, percentage figures for the different kinds of speech errors may be of limited accuracy. Moreover, the study of speech errors gave rise to different terminologies and different ways of classifying speech errors. Here is a collection of the main types:

Speech errors can affect different kinds of segments or linguistic units:

Types
 Grammatical – For example, children take time to learn irregular verbs, so in English use the -ed form incorrectly. This is explored by Steven Pinker in his book Words and Rules.
 Mispronunciation
 Vocabulary – Young children make category approximations, using car for truck for example. This is known as hyponymy.

Examples
 "particuly" (particularly) ← elision
 "syntaxically" (syntactically) ← vocabulary

Scientific relevance

Speech production is a highly complex and extremely rapid process so that research into the involved mental mechanisms is very difficult. Investigating the audible output of the speech production system is a way to understand these mental mechanisms. According to Gary S. Dell "the inner workings of a highly complex system are often revealed by the way in which the system breaks down". Therefore, speech errors are of an explanatory value with regard to the nature of language and language production.

Performance errors may provide the linguist with empirical evidence for linguistic theories and serve to test hypotheses about language and speech production models. For that reason, the study of speech errors is significant for the construction of performance models and gives insight into language mechanisms.

Evidence and insights

 Speech errors provide investigators with insights into the sequential order of language production processes.
 Speech errors clue investigators in on the interactivity of language production modules.
 The existence of lexical or phonemic exchange errors provides evidence that speakers typically engage in forward planning their utterances. It seems that before the speaker starts speaking the whole utterance is available.

 Anticipation
 Target: Take my bike.
 Error: Bake my bike.

 Perseveration
 Target: He pulled a tantrum.
 Error: He pulled a pantrum.

 Performance errors supply evidence for the psychological existence of discrete linguistic units.
 Speech errors involve substitutions, shifts, additions and deletions of segments. "In order to move a sound, the speaker must think of it as a separate unit."  Obviously, one cannot account for speech errors without speaking of these discrete segments. They constitute the planning units of language production. Among them are distinctive features, phonemes, morphemes, syllables, words and phrases. Victoria Fromkin points out that "many of the segments that change and move in speech errors are precisely those postulated by linguistic theories." Consequently, speech errors give evidence that these units are psychologically real.

 One can infer from speech errors that speakers adhere to a set of linguistic rules.
"There is a complex set of rules which the language user follows when making use of these units."  Among them are for example phonetic constraints, which prescribe the possible sequences of sounds.  Moreover, the study of speech error confirmed the existence of rules that state how morphemes are to be pronounced or how they should be combined with other morphemes. The following examples show that speech errors also observe these rules:

 Target: He likes to have his team rested. [rest+id]
 Error: He likes to have his rest teamed. [ti:m+d]

 Target: Both kids are sick. [kid+z]
 Error: Both sicks are kids. [sik+s]

 Here the past tense morpheme resp. the plural morpheme is phonologically conditioned, although the lemmas are exchanged. This proves that first the lemmas are inserted and then phonological conditioning takes place.

 Target: Don’t yell so loud! / Don’t shout so loud!
 Error: Don’t shell so loud!

 "Shout" and "yell" are both appropriate words in this context. Due to the pressure to continue speaking, the speaker has to make a quick decision which word should be selected.  This pressure leads to the speaker’s attempt to utter the two words simultaneously, which resulted in the creation of a blend.  According to Charles F. Hockett there are six possible blends of "shout" and "yell". Why did the speaker choose "shell" and not one of the alternatives? The speaker obeyed unconscious linguistic rules because he selected the blend, which satisfied the linguistic demands of these rules the best. Illegal non-words are for example instantaneously rejected.

 In conclusion, the rules which tell language users how to produce speech must also be part of our mental organization of language.

 Substitution errors, for instance, reveal parts of the organization and structure of the mental lexicon.

 Target: My thesis is too long.
 Error: My thesis is too short.

 In case of substitution errors both segments mostly belong to the same category, which means for example that a noun is substituted for a noun. Lexical selection errors are based on semantic relations such as synonymy, antonymy or membership of the same lexical field. For this reason the mental lexicon is structured in terms of semantic relationships.

 Target: George’s wife
 Error: George’s life

 Target: fashion square
 Error: passion square

 Some substitution errors which are based on phonological similarities supply evidence that the mental lexicon is also organized in terms of sound.

 Errors in speech are non-random. Linguists can elicit from the speech error data how speech errors are produced and which linguistic rules they adhere to. As a result, they are able to predict speech errors.

 Four generalizations about speech errors have been identified:
 Interacting elements tend to come from a similar linguistic environment, which means that initial, middle, final segments interact with one another.
 Elements that interact with one another tend to be phonetically or semantically similar to one another. This means that consonants exchange with consonants and vowels with vowels.
 Slips are consistent with the phonological rules of the language.
 There are consistent stress patterns in speech errors. Predominantly, both interacting segments receive major or minor stress.

 These four generalizations support the idea of the lexical bias effect. This effect states that our phonological speech errors generally form words rather than non-words. Baars (1975) showed evidence for this effect when he presented word pairs in rapid succession and asked participants to say both words in rapid succession back. In most of the trials, the mistakes made still formed actual words.

Information obtained from performance additions 
An example of the information that can be obtained is the use of "um" or "uh" in a conversation. These might be meaningful words that tell different things, one of which is to hold a place in the conversation so as not to be interrupted. There seems to be a hesitant stage and fluent stage that suggest speech has different levels of production. The pauses seem to occur between sentences, conjunctional points and before the first content word in a sentence. That suggests that a large part of speech production happens there.

Schachter et al. (1991) conducted an experiment to examine if the numbers of word choices affect pausing. They sat in on the lectures of 47 undergraduate professors from 10 different departments and calculated the number and times of filled pauses and unfilled pauses. They found significantly more pauses in the humanities departments as opposed to the natural sciences. These findings suggest that the greater the number of word choices, the more frequent are the pauses, and hence the pauses serve to allow us time to choose our words.

Slips of the tongue are another form of "errors" that can help us understand the process of speech production better. Slips can happen at many levels, at the syntactic level, at the phrasal level, at the lexical semantic level, at the morphological level and at the phonological level and they can take more than one form like: additions, substations, deletion, exchange, anticipation, perseveration, shifts, and haplologies M.F. Garrett, (1975). Slips are orderly because language production is orderly.

There are some biases shown through slips of the tongue. One kind is a lexical bias which shows that the slips people generate are more often actual words than random sound strings. Baars Motley and Mackay (1975) found that it was more common for people to turn two actual words to two other actual words than when they do not create real words. This suggests that lexemes might overlap somewhat or be stored similarly.

A second kind is a semantic bias which shows a tendency for sound bias to create words that are semantically related to other words in the linguistic environment. Motley and Baars (1976) found that a word pair like "get one" will more likely slip to "wet gun" if the pair before it is "damp rifle". These results suggest that we are sensitive to how things are laid out semantically.

Euphemistic misspeaking
Since the 1980s, the word misspeaking has been used increasingly in politics to imply that errors made by a speaker are accidental and should not be construed as a deliberate attempt to misrepresent the facts of a case. As such, its usage has attracted a degree of media coverage, particularly from critics who feel that the term is overly approbative in cases where either ignorance of the facts or intent to misrepresent should not be discarded as possibilities.

The word was used by a White House spokesman after George W. Bush seemed to say that his government was always "thinking about new ways to harm our country and our people" (a classic example of a Bushism), and more famously by then American presidential candidate Hillary Clinton who recalled landing in at the US military outpost of Tuzla "under sniper fire" (in fact, video footage demonstrates that there were no such problems on her arrival). Other users of the term include American politician Richard Blumenthal, who incorrectly stated on a number of occasions that he had served in Vietnam during the Vietnam War.

See also

 Error (linguistics)
 Auditory processing disorder
 Barbarism (grammar)
 Epenthesis
 Errors in early word use
 Folk etymology
 FOXP2
 Developmental verbal dyspraxia
 Malapropism
 Metathesis (linguistics)
 Signorelli parapraxis

References

Further reading
Bock, J. K. (1982). Toward a cognitive psychology of syntax. Psychological Review, 89, 1-47.
Garrett, M. F. (1976). Syntactic processing in sentence production. In E. Walker & R. Wales (Eds.), New approaches to language mechanisms (pp. 231–256). Amsterdam: North-Holland.
Garrett, M. F. (1980). Levels of processing in sentence production. In B. Butterworth (Ed.), Language production: Vol. 1. Speech and talk (pp. 177–220). San Diego, CA: Academic Press.

Jescheniak, J.D., Levelt, W.J.M (1994). Word Frequency Effects in Speech Production: Retrieval of Syntactic Information and of Phonological Form. Journal of Experimental Psychology: Learning, Memory, and Cognition, Vol. 20, (pp. 824–843)
Levelt, W. J. M. (1989). Speaking: From intention to articulation. Cambridge, MA: MIT Press.

Reichman, R. (1981). Plain Speaking: A Theory and Grammar of Spontaneous Discourse. Cambridge, MA
Bache, Richard Meade. (1869).  Vulgarisms and Other Errors of Speech.

External links

 

Phonetics
Speech
Speech and language pathology